UFC 15: Collision Course was a mixed martial arts event held by the Ultimate Fighting Championship on October 17, 1997, in Bay St. Louis, Mississippi.  The event was seen live on pay-per-view in the United States, and later released on home video.

History
UFC 15 was headlined by a UFC Heavyweight Championship bout between Maurice Smith and Tank Abbott. Abbott was brought in as a last-minute replacement for Dan Severn, who couldn't fight because of an injured hand. 

UFC 15 featured a Superfight between Randy Couture and Vitor Belfort, a Heavyweight Tournament, and two alternate bouts. The Superfight was billed as a Heavyweight Title Elimination bout, which can be described as a #1 Contender's match, meaning the winner would advance to compete for the UFC Heavyweight Championship at the next event, UFC Japan.

The show also marked the last event to feature Bruce Beck, who had been the main play-by-play announcer starting with UFC 4. He was replaced by Mike Goldberg in UFC Japan.

Collision Course marked a major change in the UFC's rules, with limitations set on permissible striking areas. Headbutts, groin strikes, strikes to the back of the neck and head, knees to a downed opponent, head stomps, kicks to a downed opponent, small joint manipulation, and hair pulling all became officially illegal.

Results

UFC 15 Heavyweight Tournament Bracket

1 Dwayne Cason replaced Dave Beneteau who withdrew due to fatigue.

See also 
 Ultimate Fighting Championship
 List of UFC champions
 List of UFC events
 1997 in UFC

External links
Official UFC website
UFC 15 results at Sherdog.com
UFC 15 IMDB Entry

Ultimate Fighting Championship events
1997 in mixed martial arts
Mixed martial arts in Mississippi
Sports in Bay St. Louis, Mississippi
1997 in sports in Mississippi